Vladimir Iosifovich Uflyand (1937–2007) was a Russian poet, famous for such poems as It has For Ages Been Observed; Now, At Last, Even Nikifor's A Suitor; The Peasant; and The Working Week Comes To An End.

Vladimir Uflyand was born in Leningrad (now St. Petersburg). He studied history at Leningrad State University, and later worked as a labourer and as a stoker. His poems circulated in samizdat, and he also published his poems for children in Soviet periodicals. His poetry for adults was first published in a book form in the USA in 1978, titled Texts 1955–1977. In 1993, his collection, Poems and Texts, was published in St. Petersburg. Two more poetry books followed in 1995 and in 1997. In 2000, a book of his essays was published in St. Petersburg.

External links
Obituary in Lenta.ru 
Uflyand poetry 

1937 births
2007 deaths
Russian male poets
20th-century Russian poets
20th-century Russian male writers